Mongo Wa Kenda Airport  is an airstrip serving Mongo Wa Kenda, a hamlet on the Kwango River in Kwango Province, Democratic Republic of the Congo. The runway is just north of the village.

See also

Transport in the Democratic Republic of the Congo
List of airports in the Democratic Republic of the Congo

References

External links
 Mongo Wa Kenda Airport
 HERE Maps - Mongo Wa Kenda
 OpenStreetMap - Mongo Wa Kenda
 OurAirports - Mongo Wa Kenda
 

Airports in Kwango